Danafungia scruposa is a species of coral that is the first to have been observed to eat jellyfish. It is rated as a least-concern species.

Description
During an algal bloom in 2009 researchers observed the coral consuming the jellyfish Aurelia aurita. This was the first time such behaviour has been seen in the wild. It is not known how the coral captures jellyfish. It may have caught the jellyfish with its tentacles in the same way as some sea anemones feed on other jellyfish species.

The species may contain tentacular lobes and it has dense septa. It is blue or brown in colour.

Distribution
D. scruposa is found in the eastern and western Indian Ocean, the eastern central, northwestern and western central Pacific Ocean, Japan, the East China Sea, the Red Sea, and eastern Australia. A 1991 study of specimens found that 51% were bleached. It is threatened by bleaching, disease, climate change, fishing, preadators, and human activities. F. scruposa is classified as a least concern species by the IUCN.

Taxonomy
It was originally described by Klunzinger in 1879 as Fungia scruposa. The species is also known by synonym Fungia corona (Döderlein, 1901).

References

Fungiidae
Cnidarians of the Indian Ocean
Cnidarians of the Pacific Ocean
Fauna of the Red Sea
Marine fauna of Africa
Marine fauna of Asia
Marine fauna of Oceania
Marine fauna of Southeast Asia
Marine fauna of Western Asia
Cnidarians of Australia
Corals described in 1879
Taxobox binomials not recognized by IUCN